Phyllorachis is a genus of African plants in the grass family. The only known species is Phyllorachis sagittata native to Tanzania, Zambia, Angola, Malawi, and Mozambique.

References

Oryzoideae
Monotypic Poaceae genera
Flora of Africa